"Go Flex" is a song by American rapper and singer Post Malone. It was released through Republic Records as the third single from his debut studio album, Stoney, on April 21, 2016. Malone wrote the song alongside Cashio and producers Rex Kudo and Charlie Handsome.

Music video
The song's accompanying music video premiered on April 28, 2016, on Post Malone's Vevo account on YouTube. The video features a cameo appearance by Lia Marie Johnson. As of March 2023, the video has received more than 420 million views on YouTube.

Commercial performance
"Go Flex" debuted at number 94 on the Billboard Hot 100 for the chart dated May 14, 2016. It re-entered at number 100 for the chart dated October 14, 2017, over a year later, reaching a new peak of number 88, two weeks later. It spent 10 weeks on the charts. The song was certified platinum by the Recording Industry Association of America (RIAA) for sales of over one million units in the United States.

Charts

Certifications

References

External links 
Lyrics

2016 singles
2016 songs
Republic Records singles
Post Malone songs
Songs written by Post Malone